The Hogg Baronetcy, of Upper Grosvenor Street in the County of London, is a title in the Baronetage of the United Kingdom. It was created on 20 July 1846 for the lawyer and Conservative politician James Hogg. He was Registrar of the Supreme Court of Judicature and Vice-Admiralty Court in Calcutta for many years and also represented Beverley and Honiton in the House of Commons. His son, the second Baronet, was Chairman of the Metropolitan Board of Works in London from 1870 to 1889. On 5 July 1887 he was created Baron Magheramorne, of Magheramorne in the County of Antrim, in the Peerage of the United Kingdom, as part of the celebrations for the Golden Jubilee of Queen Victoria. The title is pronounced "Marramorn" and derives from a historic site in County Antrim near Larne.

The barony became extinct on the death of the first Baron's third son, the fourth Baron, in 1957, while the baronetcy is extant.

The merchant and philanthropist Quintin Hogg, seventh son of the first Baronet, was the father of The 1st Viscount Hailsham, twice Lord High Chancellor of Great Britain.

Hogg baronets, of Upper Grosvenor Street (1846)
Sir James Weir Hogg, 1st Baronet (1790–1876)
Sir James Macnaghten McGarel-Hogg, 2nd Baronet (1823–1890) (created Baron Magheramorne in 1887)

Barons Magheramorne (1887)
James Macnaghten McGarel-Hogg, 1st Baron Magheramorne (1823–1890)
James Douglas McGarel-Hogg, 2nd Baron Magheramorne (1861–1903)
Dudley Stuart McGarel-Hogg, 3rd Baron Magheramorne (1863–1946)
Ronald Tracy McGarel-Hogg, 4th Baron Magheramorne (1865–1957)

Hogg baronets, of Upper Grosvenor Street (1846; reverted)
Sir Kenneth Weir Hogg, 6th Baronet (1894–1985)
Sir Arthur Ramsay Hogg, MBE, 7th Baronet (1896–1995)
Sir Michael David Hogg, 8th Baronet (1925–2001)
Sir Piers Michael James Hogg, 9th Baronet (born 1957)

The heir apparent is the present holder's only son James Edward Hogg (born 1985).

Line of Succession

  Rt. Hon. Sir James Weir Hogg, 1st Baronet, of Upper Grosvenor Street, co. Middlesex (1790 – 1876)
  James MacNaghten McGarel-Hogg, 1st Baron Magheramorne (1823 – 1890)
  James Douglas McGarel-Hogg, 2nd Baron Magheramorne (1861 – 1903)
  Dudley Stuart McGarel-Hogg, 3rd Baron Magheramorne (1863 – 1946)
  Ronald Tracey McGarel-Hogg, 4th Baron Magheramorne (1863 – 1957)
 Charles Swinton Hogg (1824 – 1870)
 Guy Weir Hogg (1861 – 1943)
  Sir Kenneth Weir Hogg, 6th Baronet (1894 – 1985)
 Ernest Charles Hogg (1863 – 1907)
  Sir Arthur Ramsey Hogg, 7th Baronet (1896 – 1995)
  Sir Michael David Hogg, 8th Baronet (1925 – 2001)
  Sir Piers Michael James Hogg, 9th Baronet (born 1957)
 (1) James Edward Hogg (b. 1985)
 (2) Adam Charles Hogg (b. 1958)
 (3) Daniel Richard Hogg (b. 1988)
 (4) Oliver John Hogg (b. 1961)
 Mark Arthur Philip Hogg (1928 – 2002)
 (5) Stephen Mark Hogg (b. 1960)
 (6) Simon Charles Hogg (b. 1936)
 Quintin Hogg (1845 – 1903)
  Douglas McGarel Hogg, 1st Viscount Hailsham (1872 – 1950)
 ,  Quintin McGarel Hogg, sometime 2nd Viscount Hailsham, subsequently Baron Halisham of St. Marylebone (1907 – 2001)
 (7)  Douglas Martin Hogg, 3rd Viscount Hailsham, Baron Halisham of Kettlethorpe (born 1945) =  Sarah Elizabeth Mary Boyd-Carpenter, Baroness Hogg (b. 1946)
 (8) Hon. Quintin John Neil Martin Hogg (b. 1973)
 (9) Hon. James Richard Martin Hogg (b. 1951)
 Sir Malcolm Nicholson Hogg (1883 – 1978)
 Sir John Nicholson Hogg (1912 – 1999)
 (10) Malcolm David Nicholson Hogg (b. 1949)
 (11) Richard John Nicholson Hogg (b. 1982)

See also
Viscount Hailsham

References

Sources

Hogg